Nasser Al-Mezdawi, (born 5 September 1950) is a Libyan singer, guitarist, songwriter and composer.

Discography
2000 Wahdani
1997 Raja'a
1983 Angham libiya
1975 Ughniyat an El ghurba (Annusour)

Biography
Mezdawi's first band Annusur, translates to The Eagles, released their first album "Ughniyat an Elghurba" in 1975 gaining instant popularity that rewarded them their first gold record. Mezdawi went on to participate in several international music festivals, giving concerts in Mexico, Cuba,  USA, Portugal Malta and Greece. Nasser El Mezdawi is arguably the most popular artist that came out of Libya in the mid seventies.  His work has been appreciated by the younger generation in urban North Africa and other Arab countries.

Other local artists have imitated a lot of his early work; in fact, a few very well-known artists began their careers by covering his songs almost exclusively. This distinguished guitarist who survived trends, hype and persecution is one of few consistent composers, singers/songwriters that have put their mark, permanently, in the history of music in the region.

Darja, the Arabic dialect of North Africa, is the lyrical language of this sound. While the music is not necessarily Arabic, the rhythms are often mixtures of Berber, Arab, African and popular European. Artists usually reflect their diverse ethnic backgrounds through their own distinguishable work. The progressive sound remained local for the most part but Mezdawi's music broke into the international market through other Arab and European performers.

Nasser El Mezdawi is a pioneer in this form of music whom, many believe, is responsible for transforming the way young, urban Arab performers view and express their music today. QTF-1998

References

External links
 Unofficial Website

1950 births
Living people
20th-century Libyan male singers
Libyan composers
People from Tripoli, Libya
Rotana Records artists